The Rome ePrix is an annual race of the single-seater, electrically powered Formula E championship held at the Circuito Cittadino dell'EUR in Rome, Italy. The race became official when local government unanimously approved of the race. It featured the second longest lap of the season, behind the Marrakesh ePrix, until 2019. A longer circuit was presented for the 2021 double-header, making it the longest circuit of the calendar, just above the Valencia ePrix and Monaco ePrix, the latter was extended similarly to its usual Grand Prix layout.

Results

Repeat winners (drivers)

References

 
Formula E ePrix
Auto races in Italy
Sports competitions in Rome
Recurring sporting events established in 2018
2018 establishments in Italy